Ron Knight may refer to:

Ron Knight (basketball) (born 1947), American basketball player
Ron Knight (politician) (born 1932), politician in Ontario, Canada
Ron Knight (rugby league), rugby league footballer

See also
Ronald Knight (1913–1991), English cricketer